Emanuele Ndoj (born 20 November 1996) is an Albanian professional footballer who plays as a central midfielder for Italian  club Brescia and the Albania national team.

Club career

Roma
On 22 September 2015, Ndoj renewed his contract with Roma until 2020.

Brescia
On 1 February 2016, Ndoj was sold to Brescia Calcio and was loaned back to Roma Primavera to play until the end of the season.

On 31 January 2022, Ndoj was loaned to Cosenza.

International career

Albania U17
Ndoj received his first Albania under-17 call-up by manager Džemal Mustedanagić for a friendly tournament developed in August 2012 in Romania.

Albania U21
He was called up at the Albania national under-21 football team by coach Alban Bushi for a double Friendly match against Moldova U21 on 25 & 27 March 2017. He made his debut for Albania under-21 against Moldova on 25 March playing as a starter in a goalless draw. In other match against the same opponent two days later, Ndoj played as a second-half substitute in a 2–0 victory.

2019 UEFA European Under-21 Championship qualification
Ndoj was called up for the Friendly match against France U21 on 5 June 2017 and the 2019 UEFA European Under-21 Championship qualification opening match against Estonia U21 on 12 June 2017. During the gathering for these matches Ndoj among Leonardo Maloku &  Qazim Laçi suffered injures and coach Alban Bushi called up Agim Zeka and Regi Lushkja as a replacement. Ndoj was expected by Albania U21 to recover in time for the opening match of the qualifiers against Estonia U21 on 12 June 2017, but medical staff said that he couldn't play in this match.

Albania senior team
Following his good running form at Brescia during the 2017–18 season, Ndoj received his first senior international call up to Albania senior team by coach Christian Panucci for the 2018 FIFA World Cup qualification matches against Spain and Italy on 6 and 9 October 2017. On 29 May 2018 he did his debut for the senior national team in a 3–0 loss against Kosovo in a friendly.

Career statistics

Club

International goals
Scores and results list Albania's goal tally first.

References

External links

Emanuele Ndoj Serie A TIM
Emanuele Ndoj profile at FSHF.org

1996 births
Living people
Sportspeople from Catania
Footballers from Sicily
Italian people of Albanian descent
Italian footballers
Albanian footballers
Association football midfielders
Albania youth international footballers
Albania international footballers
Albania under-21 international footballers
Brescia Calcio players
Cosenza Calcio players
Serie B players
Serie A players